Pterogonia is a genus of moths of the family Nolidae described by Swinhoe in 1891.

Description
Palpi obliquely upturned and reaching above a sharp frontal tuft. Forewings with straight costa. Outer margin angled at vein 3. Veins 8 and 9 anastomosing to form an areole. The retinaculum is bar-shaped in male. Hindwings with vein 8 anastomosing with vein 7 to middle of cell. Vein 5 from near lower angle of cell.

Species
 Pterogonia aurigutta (Walker, 1858)
 Pterogonia cardinalis Holloway, 1976
 Pterogonia cassidata Warren, 1916
 Pterogonia episcopalis Swinhoe, 1891
 Pterogonia nubes (Hampson, 1893)

References

Chloephorinae